Yzeure is a commune in the department of Allier in the Auvergne-Rhône-Alpes region of central France.

Population

Twin towns – sister cities

Yzeure is twinned with:
 Bendorf, Germany
 Gherla, Romania
 Kafountine, Senegal

See also
Communes of the Allier department
AS Yzeure

References

Communes of Allier
Allier communes articles needing translation from French Wikipedia